François Hector d’Albert, comte de Rioms or Rions (19 February 1728, Avignon – 2 October 1802, Saint-Auban-sur-l'Ouvèze) was a French Navy officer. He served in the War of American Independence, earning a membership in the Society of Cincinnati.

Biography 
Albert de Rions was born to the family of an Army general.  He joined the Navy as a Garde-Marine on 26 December 1743. He started by escorting convoys in the Caribbean in 1746, and by cruising off Tripoli in 1752. He was promoted to Lieutenant on 15 May 1756.

Albert de Rions was taken prisoner by the British at Louisbourg in 1755. Freed in 1757, he was again taken prisoner at the Battle of Cartagena on 28 February 1758.

From 1768 he commanded the 20-gun xebec Séduisant, cruising between Toulon and Livorno  and taking part in the French conquest of Corsica.

He was promoted to Captain on 18 February 1772. 
In 1778, he commanded the 50-gun Sagittaire in the squadron under D'Estaing. He took part in the Battle of Grenada on 6 July 1779 and in the naval part of the Siege of Savannah. On 23 September 1779, he captured the 50-gun HMS Experiment, which was subsequently taken into French service.

He was promoted to the command of the 74-gun Marseillais, before transferring on Pluton. He took part in the Battle of the Chesapeake on 5 September 1781, the Battle of Saint Kitts on 25 January 1782, and in the Battle of the Saintes on 12 April 1782.

He was promoted to Chef d'Escadre on 20 August 1784. From 1 January 1785, he was commander of the Navy in Toulon.  The next year, he organised a simulated naval battle with the 74-gun Patriote for Louis XVI's visit to Cherbourg. 

In January 1788, he was appointed commander of the naval forces of Toulon. The life of the workers of the arsenal was dire: their pay very low, they were liable find employment only one out of two or three days, and due to the financial crisis they were also often paid only with delay. The bad harvest of 1789 and harsh winter that year compounded the issue by raising prices, and the ensuing misery yielded unrest. Albert de Rions reacted with rigidity and scorn, notably forbidding them to wear cockades. This further alienated the workers, and on 1 December 1789, workers of Toulon arsenal rioted and seized him.  The National Assembly had him released, and replaced by Joseph de Flotte. Albert de Rions was appointed commander of the Brest squadron, but failed to restore discipline there too. 

He was promoted to contre-amiral on 1 January 1792, but abandoned his port to become an émigré and joined the Armée des Princes. He returned in France in 1801 to retire.

Sources and references 
 Notes

Citations

Bibliography
 
 
 
 
 

 

External links
 
 

French Navy admirals
Military personnel from Avignon
1802 deaths
1728 births
French military personnel of the Seven Years' War
French military personnel of the American Revolutionary War
French Royalist military leaders of the French Revolutionary Wars